Arthur Leander Strum (March 5, 1894 – August 12, 1947) was an American football, basketball, and baseball coach. He served as the head football coach at Northern Normal and Industrial School—now known was Northern State University—in Aberdeen, South Dakota in 1916, at Oshkosh State Normal School—now known as the University of Wisconsin–Oshkosh—in 1919, and three stints at Indiana State Teachers College—now known as Indiana State University (1923–1926, 1932, 1942), compiling a career college football coaching record of 30–25–2 (.545). He achieved even greater success in brief head coaching stints in men's basketball and baseball. Strum stepped down from all coaching duties following the 1927–28 school year, moving into athletics administration at Indiana State. He returned for two brief interim stints due to absences by Walter E. Marks.

Strum died of a heart attack, on August 12, 1947, in Terre Haute, Indiana.

Head coaching record

Football

References

1894 births
1947 deaths
Basketball coaches from Minnesota
Indiana State Sycamores athletic directors
Indiana State Sycamores baseball coaches
Indiana State Sycamores football coaches
Indiana State Sycamores men's basketball coaches
Northern State Wolves football coaches
Northern State Wolves men's basketball coaches
Wisconsin–Oshkosh Titans football coaches
Sports coaches from Minneapolis